Pieter Helbert Damsté (August 10, 1860 – February 5, 1943) was a Dutch classical scholar.

Biography
Damsté was born in Wilsum as the son of preacher Barteld Roelof Damsté and Richardina Jacoba Gesina Gallé. His 1885 dissertation was called Adversaria critica ad C. Valerii Flacci Argonautica. He taught Latin at Utrecht University.

External links
 Biography and list of publications
 Biography

1860 births
1943 deaths
People from Kampen, Overijssel
Dutch classical scholars
Classical scholars of Utrecht University